Sandra Hodgkinson is an American lawyer and officer in the United States Navy Reserve. She currently serves as senior vice president for strategic planning and chief of staff at DRS Technologies and Leonardo North America, headquartered in Arlington, Virginia.

Career
Prior to joining DRS in 2012, Hodgkinson served as a career civil servant up through the rank of Senior Executive Service (SES) at the United States Department of Defense, United States Department of State, and the White House during both the George W. Bush and Barack Obama administrations. Her assignments included Special Assistant (Chief of Staff) to Deputy Secretary of Defense William J. Lynn III, Deputy Assistant Secretary of Defense (DASD), Distinguished Visiting Research Fellow at National Defense University (NDU), Deputy to the Ambassador-at-Large for War Crimes Issues, Director for International Justice at the National Security Council (NSC), and Senior Advisor at the Coalition Provisional Authority (CPA) in Baghdad, Iraq. Prior to civil service, Hodgkinson spent six years as a U.S. Navy Judge Advocate General's (JAG) Corps officer serving as an appellate clerk, Prosecutor/International Criminal Jurisdiction Officer (Naples, Italy), and as a Country Program Director, training foreign military and civilians in over 30 countries. She is a Captain in the Navy JAG Corps reserves.

References

External links

Year of birth missing (living people)
Living people
Guantanamo Bay attorneys
Female United States Navy officers
United States Department of Defense officials
United States Department of State officials
United States Navy captains
United States Navy reservists